The thirty-third season of the American animated television series The Simpsons premiered on Fox on September 26, 2021 and ended on May 22, 2022. The season consisted of twenty-two episodes. On March 3, 2021, the season was ordered alongside a 34th season.

Production

Development
Al Jean stated that he would showrun at least four episodes of the season, "plus something special." The premiere episode, "The Star of the Backstage" is "like a Broadway musical of an episode with wall to wall music." The Treehouse of Horror episode of the season, "Treehouse of Horror XXXII", features five segments instead of the usual three. Two more episode plots have been revealed for the season; one will follow a romance involving Moe Szyslak and the other will be about "the greatest tragedy Homer has ever faced," guest starring Rachel Bloom. The former plot was later revealed to be the premise of "The Wayz We Were", and the latter plot was  revealed to be the premise of "Mothers and Other Strangers". In November, the two-part episode "A Serious Flanders" aired as "an epic love letter to the show Fargo and the world of streaming television."

Promotional shorts
Two animated short films were released to Disney+ during this season's run, titled Plusaversary (released November 12, 2021), which features Homer and Goofy drinking at Moe's Tavern in celebration of the streaming service's 2nd anniversary, and When Billie Met Lisa (released April 22, 2022), which features a guest star in singer Billie Eilish discussing life with Lisa Simpson.

Casting
There were plans for the character Apu Nahasapeemapetilon, who has been in major controversy since 2017, to make an appearance. However, Simpsons creator Matt Groening stated "we have to see if we can make the stories work". The two-part episode "A Serious Flanders" includes guest stars Timothy Olyphant, Cristin Milioti, and Brian Cox.

A new character was introduced in "Lisa's Belly", Dr. Wendy Sage, a hypnotherapist who is also a breast cancer survivor. She visibly has one of her breasts removed. She was created and voiced by Renee Ridgeley, an actress, writer, and real-life breast cancer survivor and the wife of Simpsons writer Matt Selman.

On April 21, 2022, it was announced that Kerry Washington officially joined the cast in a recurring role as Bart's fourth grade teacher, Ms. Peyton, replacing the late Mrs. Krabappel. Ms. Peyton was first introduced in the episode "My Octopus and a Teacher".

Critical reception
John Schwarz from Bubbleblabber.com rated the season a 7.5/10. in his review: "revisiting The Simpsons in its thirty-third season is like reuniting with old friends after a decade or so. They may have changed a bit since I last saw them, but they’re still the same humorous yellow-skinned family I remembered years ago. While its latest season may not match the iconic family’s glory days, it still delivers plenty of giggles and surprises in its episodes to continue the show’s long-running success. Even its special episodes, mainly 'A Serious Flanders', are strong enough to make my visit to Springfield more fun. Hopefully, my next visit during its upcoming thirty-fourth season will be just as amusing."

Episodes

Release
This season aired on Sundays during the 2021–22 television season as part of Fox's Animation Domination programming block, along with The Great North, Bob's Burgers, Duncanville, and Family Guy. In the United States, after each episode aired, they were released on Hulu the day after. In Canada, Australia and Spain, the season aired weekly on Wednesdays on Disney+ through the Star content hub internationally and on Star+ in Latin America. The first eighteen episodes were removed from Hulu and every episode was added on Disney+ in the United States on October 5, 2022, with the final four episodes remaining on Hulu, with one episode being removed each week.

References

External links
 

Simpsons season 33
2021 American television seasons
2022 American television seasons